"Blue Magic" is the first single from Jay-Z's tenth studio album, American Gangster. The song was released as a single on September 20, 2007. In the chorus, Pharrell sings an interpretation of the song "Hold On" by the R&B girl group En Vogue, who are also featured in the song. The name "Blue Magic" is a reference to a potent form of heroin sold by Frank Lucas at the height of his drug trade in Harlem, New York. An official remix features Pharrell and Trey Songz.

The lyrics in the first verse refer to Eric B. & Rakim's song "My Melody". Most of the song itself is a reference to the 1980s. Jay-Z brings up his time as an early age drug dealer with links to the Iran-Contra scandal and CIA and Contras cocaine trafficking in the US that rocked the 1980s and the Reagan Presidency.

Blame Reagan for making me into a monster
Blame Oliver North and Iran-Contra
I ran contraband that they sponsored
Before this rhyming stuff we was in concert

Blue Magic also samples the 1931 horror film, Frankenstein.

Chamillionaire released a freestyle of this song for his Mixtape Messiah 4 called "What the Business Is". Royce Da 5'9" released a freestyle of this song called "Blue Magic". It was a "diss" track on Mistah F.A.B..

Music video
The music video was directed by Hype Williams with costumes designed by June Ambrose. It was first shown on BET's 106 & Park on October 11, 2007. The video shows the recording artist and dancer Teyana Taylor, dancing and popping throughout the video. The video appeared at the bottom of BET's Notarized: Top 100 Videos of 2007 on December 31, 2007. The video was noted for prominently featuring wads and a suitcase full of 500 Euro notes, and it was noted that the video gave the euro media attention at a time when the U.S. dollar had sharply lost in value against most major world currencies such as the euro, pound Sterling and Canadian dollar.

Charts

References

External links

2007 singles
Jay-Z songs
Pharrell Williams songs
Song recordings produced by the Neptunes
Songs written by Pharrell Williams
Songs about drugs
Songs written by Jay-Z
2007 songs
Songs written by Denzil Foster
Songs written by Thomas McElroy
Songs written by Foster & McElroy
Roc-A-Fella Records singles
Music videos directed by Hype Williams